Jędrzejczyk is a Polish surname. Notable people with the surname include:

 Artur Jędrzejczyk (born 1987), Polish footballer
 Joanna Jędrzejczyk (born 1987), Polish martial arts performer
 Paweł Jędrzejczyk (born 1980), Polish martial arts performer

Polish-language surnames